The Librarians were a power pop band from Berkeley, California who formed in 1999 by Damon Larson and Ryan Gan. They released one album, The Pathetic Aesthetic, in 2002, which received 4 out of 5 stars from Allmusic.

The group was famous mostly for their raucous live act:
But (Ryan) Gan, the anti-frontperson frontperson of the Librarians, isn't even fazed. Though on the record, Gan's job is limited to backup vocals and tambourine for vocalist-guitarist Damon Larson, he explodes into his full potential onstage with spastic tambourine beating and poster-worthy one-hand-on-the-hip-the-other-thrust-skyward poses. His performance is truly horrifying in its cheesiness, and yet it's unnervingly mesmerizing. It's a kind of innocence-lost scenario: everyone reaches the same guilty conclusion, "Christ, why don't more bands do this?"

Ryan Gan received his Master's in Library and Information Science in 2006 and is now employed as a librarian and professor in Torrance, California. Prior to this and the formation of the band, Gan played the euphonium at Magnolia High School in Anaheim, California between 1990 and 1994. Gan has since picked up the euphonium again and is playing in a community band. Since leaving the Librarians, Damon Larson has continued his musical career.  His newest band, the Paranoids, is a fixture on the San Francisco music scene.

References

External links
Music Video for The Librarians song "You and this Bottle" on Youtube.com

AMG's entry for the band 

"Storming the Stacks - When was last time you saw a Librarian shake his ass?" at Metroactive.com.

Musical groups established in 1999
1999 establishments in California